Dundonald Football Club is a Northern Irish, intermediate football club playing in Division 1C of the Northern Amateur Football League. The club is based in Dundonald, County Down, and was formed in 1956. The club plays in the Irish Cup.

References

External links
  Club website]

Association football clubs in Northern Ireland
Association football clubs established in 1956
Association football clubs in County Down
Northern Amateur Football League clubs
1956 establishments in Northern Ireland